Bunu can refer to:

Bu-Nao language, a Hmong–Mien language
Bunu languages, an putative branch of the Hmongic languages
Bunu language (Nigeria), an East Kainji language of Nigeria
Kabba/Bunu, a Local Government Area in Kogi State, Nigeria

ar:بونو (توضيح)#استعمالات أخرى وكلمات مشابهة